The following list contains awards and nominations received by Canadian singer the Weeknd.

After co-founding the XO record label in 2011, he rose to prominence following the release of his critically-acclaimed mixtapes, House of Balloons, Thursday, and Echoes of Silence. House of Balloons was one of the ten shortlisted nominees for the 2011 Polaris Music Prize, while Echoes of Silence was a longlisted nominee for the 2012 Polaris Music Prize.

In 2012, the Weeknd signed with Republic Records and re-released his three mixtapes in the compilation album, Trilogy (2012). His debut studio album, Kiss Land (2013), was released to generally positive reviews. For the single "Earned It" from the soundtrack to the film, Fifty Shades of Grey (2015), the Weeknd received a nomination for the Academy Award for Best Original Song, and won the Grammy Award for Best R&B Performance. He gained major critical and commercial success with his second studio album, Beauty Behind the Madness (2015), which won the Grammy Award for Best Urban Contemporary Album, and received a nomination for Album of the Year. He won a second Grammy Award for Best Urban Contemporary Album in 2018 for his third studio album, Starboy (2016). His 2021 Super Bowl Halftime performance earned him a Primetime Emmy Award nomination for Outstanding Variety Special (Live). 

His other accolades include an additional two Grammy Awards, twenty Billboard Music Awards, twenty-two Juno Awards, six American Music Awards, and five Guinness World Records.

Awards and nominations

Other accolades

Listicles

State and cultural honours

World records

Notes

References

Weeknd, The
The Weeknd